Charles Hubert Vincent (Fontainebleau, 15 April 1828 – 16 August 1888) was a 19th-century French playwright, chansonnier, goguettier, novelist, journalist and publisher.

Biography 
Coming from a family of four generations of wig makers, he left the Graduate School of Fontainebleau at the age of thirteen and engaged in several little jobs. He was alternatively a notary and "avoué" clerk. In 1840, he moved to Paris as upholsterer and then worked as traveling salesman.
 
During the French Revolution of 1848, Charles attracted attention with his revolutionary poems, published in 1849 under the title Album révolutionnaire. Chants démocratiques.

In 1850, he definitively settled in Paris, and from singing to political meetings, he naturally came to journalism and songwriting. Charles Vincent became famous.

He wrote many novels, poems and songs, including the collection titled Refrains du dimanche (Paris, 1856), composed in collaboration with Édouard Plouvier and illustrated by Gustave Doré. In 1860, he published Histoire de la chaussure et des cordonniers, and several novels.
 
As a journalist, he collaborated with Le Siècle and founded Le Moniteur de la cordonnerie, which frequently paid its editors with shoes ... La Halle aux cuirs was one of the first technical journal in the French press.

He established or directed several fashion magazines: L'Illustrateur des dames, La Joie du foyer, La Boîte à ouvrage, etc. He was a pioneer in the specialized press and all his ventures prospered.

He also authored L'Enfant du Tour de France, five-act drama given in 1857, as well as one vaudeville, La Crème des domestiques, in 1858.
 
The child of the Revolution of 1848 made thus a fortune under the Second French Empire but remained true to songwriting throughout his life.

In 1878, 1881, 1883 and 1886, Charles Vincent was elected president of the famous Parisian goguette, the Caveau, the fourth of its name.

Some works 
 Album révolutionnaire, Paris, 1849.
 L'Enfant du Tour de France, Paris, 1857.
 La Crème des domestiques, Paris, 1858.
 Chansons mois et toasts, E. Dentu, Éditeur, Paris, 1882.

References

External links 
 Charles Vincent (1826–1888) on data.bnf.fr
 Charles Vincent, publiciste et homme de lettres
 Charles Vincent, président du Caveau

French chansonniers
19th-century French journalists
French male journalists
French publishers (people)
19th-century French novelists
19th-century French dramatists and playwrights
1828 births
People from Fontainebleau
1888 deaths
19th-century French male writers